Katrina Andry (born 1981) is an American visual artist and printmaker. She is based in New Orleans, Louisiana.

Early life and education 
Katrina Andry was born in New Orleans, Louisiana. Andry first studied graphic design at Louisiana State University and received her BFA in 2004. She then studied printmaking at Louisiana State University (LSU) in Baton Rouge, Louisiana, and received her MFA degree in 2010. While at school, Andry was inspired by artists such as Adrian Piper.

Career 
Andry has worked in New Orleans, as well as at Xavier University in Ohio. She uses color-reduction wood cut prints in small and large-scale prints. Some of her prints are almost five feet long in order to expose the view to degrading clichés. Andry's works never contain a specific person, but more of an ideal of certain groups of people. Her work is featured in multiple publications such as, New American Paintings, edition 118, Art in Print, and The Saratoga Collection.

Andry's work explores the negative effects stereotypes have on people of color. She is known for her large-scale, full-color woodblock prints. Her works feature white subjects in blackface, depicting negative cliches and caricatures of black culture. Through these depictions, Andry explores how stereotypes are perpetuated to benefit a majority while disenfranchising other groups of people. Andry challenges the majority social norms and questions how these norms affect how individuals see one another. She also uses non-people-of-color in her work to portray more than black culture. However, when Andry's works are seen as black culture, the stereotype-norms are emphasized. She typically uses white men to symbolize authority over people of color stereotypes. Andry shows this visually in her work by practicing large-scale color reduction in woodcut prints.

Andry was listed in the September, 2012 Art in Print magazine as one of the top 50 printmakers. She has recently shown at the Hammonds House Museum (solo), the Pensacola Museum of Art (solo), and the New Orleans Museum of Art. She has also been an artist-in-residence at Anchor Graphics in Chicago; Kala Art Institute in Berkeley, California; and the Joan Mitchell Center in New Orleans.

Andry's work has been exhibited at the Ogden Museum of Southern Art and Contemporary Arts Center, New Orleans. In 2016, Andry's work was included in the Atlanta Biennial at the Atlanta Contemporary Art Center alongside artists Coco Fusco, Skylar Fein, Harmony Korine, Kalup Linzy and Stacy Lynn Waddell.

Recognition 
Andry was identified in the Jan./Feb. 2012 issue of Art in Print as one of the top 50 printmakers. Andry has been awarded residencies from the Joan Mitchell Center of New Orleans, Anchor Graphics in Chicago, and the Kala Art Institute in Berkeley, California. In 2016, Andry received a grant from the Art Matters Foundation.

Exhibitions 
 2008–2010: Stabbed in the Art, Bohemian Gallery, Baton Rouge, LA
 2009: Business Casual, High Water Gallery
 2009: Lock Down, Good Children Gallery
 2009: Everything Must Go, Good Children Gallery
 2009: First Wednesday, Baton Rouge Gallery
 2009: BookOpolis, Bookworks
 2010: Emerge, Ogden Museum of Southern Art
 2010: Here and Now, Bricks and Bombs Gallery
 2010: 12th Annual Venus Envy, Baton Rouge Gallery
 2011: Instructions – Call and Response, Antenna Gallery
 2011: Mahalia Jackson Tribute, Stella Jones Gallery
 2011: What We Can Do, Antenna Gallery
 2011: Black Art Now, M Francis Gallery
 2012: Otherness and American Values, Staple Goods
 2012: Geographica, DuMois Gallery
 2012: Nola Now, Contemporary Arts Center, New Orleans
 2012: Heavy Hitters, Peveto Gallery
 2013: Visual Artist Network (VAN) Annual Show, Contemporary Arts Center, New Orleans
 2013: Shape of Place, Staple Goods
 2014: Together We Stare Out From the Shadows; Hiding From Their Prejudiced Stares, Isaac Delgado Fine Arts Gallery – Delgado Community College
 2015: Indecent Intentions Leave Me Vulnerable and Voiceless, Staple Goods
 2015: Initiating Cause and Effect, Jonathan Ferrara Gallery
 2016: Atlanta Biennial, The Atlanta Contemporary Art Center

References

External links 
"Bad Apple: Katrina Andry at the Isaac Delgado Fine Arts Gallery" by Tori Bush, Pelican Bomb, February 21, 2014

1981 births
Living people
American women printmakers
African-American women artists
Artists from New Orleans
Louisiana State University alumni
21st-century American printmakers
21st-century American women artists
African-American printmakers
21st-century African-American women
21st-century African-American artists
20th-century African-American people
20th-century African-American women